The 2015 Missouri Valley Conference women's basketball tournament, nicknamed "Arch Madness", is part of the 2014–15 NCAA Division I women's basketball season and will be played in St. Charles, Missouri March 12–15, 2015, at the Family Arena. This year marks the eighth consecutive and final year the tournament will be held at Family Arena. The tournament will move to iWireless Center for the 2016 season. This year marks the first year every game will be televised live on ESPN3. The championship took place Sunday, March 15 at 2:07 PM (central). The tournament's winner received the Missouri Valley Conference's automatic bid to the 2015 NCAA tournament.

Tournament bracket

References

External links
Missouri Valley Conference Official Website

2014–15 NCAA Division I women's basketball season
Missouri Valley Conference women's basketball tournament